The GUSTO (Galactic / Extragalactic ULDB Spectroscopic Terahertz Observatory) mission is a planned high-altitude balloon mission that will carry an infrared telescope to measure fine-structure line emission from the interstellar medium. The mission is being developed by NASA's Explorers Program for launch in December 2023 from Antarctica.

Overview 
GUSTO will provide the first complete study of the life cycle of the interstellar medium, the gas and dust from which all stars and planets are formed. The mission is a Mission of Opportunity (MO) of NASA's Explorer's Program and is expected to cost about US$40 million. It follows from the experience gained from two precursor or "pathfinder" missions: the Stratospheric Terahertz Observatory (STO) launched on 15 January 2012, and STO-2 launched on 8 December 2016. The principal investigator is Christopher Walker at the University of Arizona in Tucson, Arizona.

It will map portions of the Milky Way galaxy and the Large Magellanic Cloud in three specific regions of the far infrared (FIR) portion of the electromagnetic spectrum called the "terahertz lines of carbon, nitrogen and oxygen".

The flight is scheduled to launch in December 2023 from McMurdo, Antarctica, and is expected to stay airborne for 70 to 120 days, depending on weather conditions. GUSTO will be controlled and monitored from several stations around the United States.

Objective 
The objective of GUSTO is to provide the first complete spectroscopic study of all phases of the stellar life cycle, from the formation of molecular clouds (also called stellar nurseries), through star birth and evolution, to the formation of interstellar gas clouds and the re-initiation of the cycle. This will allow to determine the composition, energetics, and dynamics of the interstellar medium. It will do so by observing simultaneously in three specific far infrared (FIR) wavelengths. The researchers state that "this unique and novel combination of data will provide information needed to untangle the complexities of the interstellar medium".

Telescope and detectors 
The gondola, avionics and solar panels will be provided by the Johns Hopkins Applied Physics Laboratory. The University of Arizona in Tucson will provide the telescope with an array of cryogenic terahertz radiation superconducting heterodyne detectors built in a collaborative effort with the Massachusetts Institute of Technology (MIT), Arizona State University, the Netherlands Institute for Space Research (SRON), Virginia Diodes (VDI), and Ball Aerospace. The detectors will measure the terahertz lines of carbon, oxygen and nitrogen, at 158 μm, 63 μm, and 205 μm respectively.

Balloon 
The superpressure balloon to be used is called Ultralong-Duration Balloon (ULDB), where the volume of the balloon is kept relatively constant independent of the changes in the temperature of the contained lifting gas. It will be provided by NASA's Balloon Program Office.

The flight will make use of a weather phenomenon known as an anticyclone that occurs during the Antarctic summer. The wind vortex will take the balloon on a circular flight trajectory over Antarctica for 70 to 120 days. Recovery might not be possible for GUSTO, as the southern winter progresses the polar vortex will weaken and the balloon will leave Antarctica and drift northward.

References 

Infrared telescopes
Astronomical imaging
Observational astronomy
Explorers Program